The Hacker Ethic and the Spirit of the Information Age is a book released in 2001, and written by Pekka Himanen, with prologue written by Linus Torvalds and the epilogue written by Manuel Castells.

Pekka Himanen is a philosopher. Manuel Castells is an internationally well-known sociologist. Linus Torvalds is the creator of the Linux kernel.

See also

 Hacker ethic
 Linus's law
 The Art of Unix Programming

References

External links 

 Book in Google books

2001 non-fiction books
Computer science books
Ethics books
Information Age